The Anaheim Ducks are a professional ice hockey team based in Anaheim, California, United States. They are members of the Pacific Division of the Western Conference of the National Hockey League (NHL). The team was founded as an expansion franchise in 1993 as the Mighty Ducks of Anaheim. The team has had six general managers.

Key

General managers

Notes
 A running total of the number of general managers of the franchise. Thus any general manager who has two or more separate terms as general manager is only counted once.

See also
List of NHL general managers

References

General managers
Anaheim Ducks general managers
general managers